The United Kingdom competed under the name Great Britain at the 2006 Winter Olympics in Turin, Italy. Athletes from Northern Ireland were generally free to participate for either this team or the Ireland team under a long-standing settlement between the British Olympic Association and the Olympic Council of Ireland. Forty-one athletes were selected for these Winter Games.

Medallists

Alpine skiing 

In the super-G and downhill, Chemmy Alcott was a rare female competitor in a historically male-dominated GB team. Alcott impressed as she finished 11th in the women's downhill, but was disqualified from the combined due to a technical infringement with the width of her skis.

Noel Baxter, Alain Baxter and James Leuzinger were the men's representatives in the slalom, and the Baxters also raced in the giant slalom. Finlay Mickel and Roger Cruickshank were the men's downhill and super-G skiers.

In the men's downhill, Finlay Mickel finished 25th, 2.68 seconds behind the winner Antoine Dénériaz. Roger Cruickshank, skiing with a knee-brace, finished 37th, 5.85 behind. Noel Baxter finished 14th in the men's combined. Cruickshank also finished 37th in the giant slalom before announcing his retirement from skiing.

Note: In the men's combined, run 1 is the downhill, and runs 2 and 3 are the slalom. In the women's combined, run 1 and 2 are the slalom, and run 3 the downhill.

Biathlon

Bobsleigh 

The men chosen for the 2-man and 4-man bobsleigh event were: Marcus Adam, Dan Humphries, Lee Johnston, Karl Johnston and Martin Wright.

The competitors for the 2-woman event were Nicola Minichiello and Jackie Davies.

Curling

Britain sent two teams to the Olympic curling competition. All of the members of both teams were Scottish. The women's team were the defending Olympic gold medallists.

The members of the men's team were Euan Byers, Ewan McDonald, David Murdoch, Warwick Smith and Craig Wilson. 
The members of the women's team were Kelly Wood, Lynn Cameron, Deborah Knox, Jacqueline Lockhart and Rhona Martin.

Men's tournament

Team: David Murdoch, Ewan MacDonald, Warwick Smith, Euan Byers and Craig Wilson (alternate)

Round robin
Draw 1
;Draw 2
;Draw 4
;Draw 5
;Draw 6
;Draw 8
;Draw 9
;Draw 10
;Draw 11

Standings

Playoffs
Semi-final
;Bronze Medal Game

Women's tournament

Team: Rhona Martin, Jacqueline Lockhart, Kelly Wood, Lynn Cameron and Deborah Knox (alternate)

Round robin
Draw 1
;Draw 2
;Draw 4
;Draw 5
;Draw 7
;Draw 8
;Draw 9
;Draw 10
;Draw 12

Standings

Figure skating 

The British figure skating representatives were Sinead Kerr and her brother John Kerr, who competed in ice dancing. They hail from Scotland and Turin was their first Olympic games.

Key: CD = Compulsory Dance, FD = Free Dance, FS = Free Skate, OD = Original Dance, SP = Short Program

Luge 

The British luge participants for 2006 were Mark Hatton and Adam Rosen. Hatton finished a disappointing 35th place after coming off his luge on his third run of four, although he stayed in contact with the luge and remounted. Rosen finished in 16th place.

Short track speed skating 

The men's short track speed skating team was Jon Eley and Paul Stanley. The women's team was Sarah Lindsay and Joanna Williams. Lindsay participated in the 2002 Winter Olympics in Salt Lake City.

This was the first Olympics in which Great Britain and Northern Ireland sent a full short track speed skating team.

Key: 'ADV' indicates a skater was advanced due to being interfered with.

Skeleton 

Two men and one woman skeleton athletes travelled to Turin. Shelley Rudman was selected as the woman's sole representative; the men were Kristan Bromley and Adam Pengilly

Shelley Rudman won the silver medal in the women's event, while Bromley and Pengilly finished fifth and eighth respectively.

Snowboarding 

The GB team had four competitors in the snowboarding events at the Olympics in 2006, with veteran competitor Lesley McKenna falling in both runs of the half pipe alongside first-time Olympians Kate Foster and Daniel Wakeham. First-time Olympian Zoe Gillings was the sole British competitor in the snowboardcross event which had its first Olympic appearance in 2006.

Wakeham finished 26th in men's halfpipe qualifying, missing the final. Gillings qualified 12th for the snowboard cross quarter-finals with a time of 1:31. She failed to progress further, being taken out of the heat following a collision with another rider and finished 15th.

Halfpipe

Note: In the final, the single best score from two runs is used to determine the ranking. A bracketed score indicates a run that wasn't counted.

Snowboard cross

References

External links
British Olympic Association

Nations at the 2006 Winter Olympics
2006
Winter Olympics
Winter sports in the United Kingdom